Tirath Ram Amla (1913-2009) was an Indian politician from Jammu and Kashmir. He was born on 13 April 1913 in Muzaffarabad, Kashmir (British India).

He was elected to Upper House of India Parliament - the Rajya Sabha for four term 1967–1970, 1970–1976, 1976–1982 and 1985–1991 from Indian National Congress Party.
Amla was arguably the most successful businessmen from the Kashmir Valley. Among other things, he set up Hotel Broadway and Broadway Cinema (which later burnt down) in Srinagar. He also built the iconic Hotel Broadway, Old Delhi in 1956. Today, it is managed by his grandson, prominent restaurateur Rohit Khattar's Old World Hospitality (OWH).

Amla married Satyadevi in 1939. They had 3 children - Krishan, Vijay Lakshmi and Kiran. Kiran married Vijay Dhar, son of the stalwart Kashmiri politician DP Dhar.
Amla died in New Delhi on 22 January 2009 of a stroke.

References

Rajya Sabha members from Jammu and Kashmir
2009 deaths
Indian National Congress politicians
1913 births